Óscar Serrano may refer to:

 Óscar Serrano (athlete) (born 1973), Paralympic athlete from Spain
 Óscar Serrano (tennis) (born 1978), former Spanish tennis player
 Óscar Serrano (footballer) (born 1981), Spanish footballer